Haqiqat-e Inquilab-e Saur ('Truth of the Saur Revolution') was a daily newspaper in Afghanistan. It was owned by the central committee of the People's Democratic Party of Afghanistan.

In the mid-1980s, it had a circulation of 50,000 and was the main print medium in the country. It was named for Afghanistan's Saur Revolution, the 1978 Communist coup that overthrew Mohammed Daoud Khan.

References

1980s establishments in Afghanistan
Communist newspapers
Daily newspapers published in Afghanistan
Publications established in 1980
Publications with year of disestablishment missing